The  were a series of earthquakes, including a magnitude 7.0 mainshock which struck at 01:25 JST on April 16, 2016 (16:25 UTC on April 15)  beneath  Kumamoto City of Kumamoto Prefecture in  Kyushu Region, Japan, at a depth of about , and a foreshock earthquake with a magnitude 6.2 at 21:26 JST (12:26 UTC) on April 14, 2016, at a depth of about .

In total, the two earthquakes killed 273 people and injured 2,809 others, a majority of them indirectly. Severe damage occurred in Kumamoto and Ōita Prefectures, with numerous structures collapsing and catching fire. More than 44,000 people were evacuated from their homes due to the disaster.

Earthquakes

April 14 foreshock 

Although the focus of the foreshock earthquake was  beneath Mount Kinpo to the north-northwest of Kumamoto's city center, the worst-hit area was in the eastern Kumamoto suburb of Mashiki, where the foreshock earthquake's victims perished. The earthquake was strongly felt as far north as Shimonoseki on southwestern Honshu, and as far south as the city of Kirishima in Kagoshima Prefecture. In the following hours, there were at least 11 aftershocks of at least 4.5 magnitude, one of which was a magnitude 6; more than 140 aftershocks were registered within two days. It was the first earthquake to occur on the island of Kyushu to register as a 7 on the Japan Meteorological Agency seismic intensity scale. On April 15, the JMA officially labelled it  ("Heisei 28 Kumamoto Earthquake")–Heisei 28 being the year 2016 on the Japanese calendar.

April 16 mainshock 
At 01:25 JST on April 16 (16:25 UTC, April 15), a 7.0 magnitude earthquake, under Higashi Ward of Kumamoto City in the Kyushu Region in southwest Japan, occurred as the result of strike-slip faulting at shallow depth. Significant additional damage occurred in those areas of Kumamoto Prefecture recovering from the April 14 earthquake, with strong tremors and damage also recorded as far east as the city of Beppu in Ōita Prefecture. It was also felt as far away as Busan, South Korea, with an intensity of MMI III.

Aftershocks 
The following is a list of major aftershocks that have occurred in Kumamoto Prefecture since April 14, 2016.

Damage and casualties 
As a result of the tremors, the entirety of Kumamoto city was left without water. All residents of Nishihara Village in Kumamoto Prefecture were evacuated over fears that a nearby dam could collapse. Kumamoto Airport was also closed to all but emergency flights, and service on the Kyushu Shinkansen was suspended after a train derailed due to the earthquake. Numerous structures collapsed or caught fire as a result of the earthquake. Government officials estimated more than 1,000 buildings had been seriously damaged, with 90 destroyed. A 500-bed hospital in Kumamoto City was knocked off its foundations, forcing the evacuation of all patients, and a natural gas leak prompted Saibu Gas to turn off supplies to multiple homes in the city.

Numerous landslides took place across the mountains of Kyushu, rendering roads impassable, The  of the Japan National Route 325 in Minamiaso collapsed into the Kurokawa river. A particularly large rockslide was photographed blocking the entirety of a four-lane express-way close to the fallen Great Aso Bridge, leaving a large scar that ran almost completely up the hill that suffered the rockslide.

The Aso Shrine was also heavily damaged in the earthquake. The shrine's rōmon (tower gate), officially classified as an Important Cultural Property by the Japanese government, and the haiden (worshiping hall) both completely collapsed. Kumamoto Castle, another Important Cultural Property sustained damage to its roof and exterior buildings and walls because of the earthquakes and associated aftershocks. Several of the castle's shachihoko ornaments were destroyed, and a large number of kawara tiles also fell from the roof. Other historical buildings such as Janes' Residence, the first western-style house built in Kumamoto (dating from 1871) were also totally destroyed. The former registered Cultural Asset was initially located in the grounds of Kumamoto Castle, but was later relocated near Suizen-ji Jōju-en.

Early estimates of the economic costs of the damage range from $5.5 billion to $7.5 billion, with insured property losses estimated to be between $800 million to $1.2 billion, according to Risk Management Solutions or between $1.7 billion to $2.9 billion, according to Guy Carpenter. Through the first half of 2016, about $3.2 billion of claims for damage to residential dwellings were paid out by insurance companies, according to data from the General Insurance Association of Japan.

At least nine people lost their lives and approximately 1,000 more were injured by the April 14 foreshock. By April 16, more than 44,000 people were evacuated from the hardest-hit areas. Prime Minister Shinzō Abe mobilized 3,000 personnel of the Japan Self-Defense Forces to assist local authorities with search and rescue and recovery efforts.

At least 273 people were killed and 2,809 others were injured by the mainshock, including many indirectly. Kumamoto Prefectural Police got more than 300 calls and also Ōita Prefectural Police took 100 calls, some reporting people trapped or buried under debris. More than 91,700 people were evacuated. An additional 15,000 soldiers from the Japan Self-Defense Forces joined relief efforts following the earthquake. By April 18, the number of people seeking shelter had risen to 180,000, while at least eight people remained missing in a landslide caused by the earthquake.

Geology 
Kumamoto Prefecture lies at the southern end of the Japan Median Tectonic Line, Japan's longest, where a system of active faults forks in two directions at the Beppu-Haneyama Fault Zone. Specifically, the series of quakes ruptured the 81-km-long Hinagu Fault and 64-km-long Futagawa Fault to its north, as well as lesser but discernable interaction with the farther flung Beppu-Haneyama Fault Zone. A 27-km section of the Futagawa Fault Zone slid 3.5 meters. The earthquakes are occurring along the Beppu–Shimabara graben, with epicentres moving from west to east over time.

Around 08:30 local time on 16 April, Mount Aso saw a small-scale eruption with ash billowing  into the air; the eruption was not related to the earthquake. Mount Aso had already been active since before the earthquakes, being under a Level 2 warning from the JMA since November 24, 2015.

See also 
 1889 Kumamoto earthquake
 List of earthquakes in 2016
 List of earthquakes in Japan

References

External links 

 The 2016 Kumamoto Earthquake -Portal- - Japan Meteorological Agency
 Magnitude 6.2 Earthquake in Japan - United States Geological Survey
 Magnitude 7.0 Earthquake in Japan - United States Geological Survey
 Earthquake and Volcano Information - 15th April, 2016 Earthquake in Kumamoto prefecture - Earthquake Research Institute, University of Tokyo
 

2016 earthquakes
April 2016 events in Japan
Earthquakes of the Heisei period
Earthquakes in Kumamoto Prefecture
Kumamoto
Earthquake clusters, swarms, and sequences
Landslides in Japan
Shindo 7 earthquakes
2016 disasters in Japan